LIM/homeobox protein Lhx4 is a protein that in humans is encoded by the LHX4 gene.

This gene encodes a member of a large protein family which contains the LIM domain, a unique cysteine-rich zinc-binding domain. The encoded protein may function as a transcriptional regulator and be involved in control of differentiation and development of the pituitary gland. Mutations in this gene are associated with syndromic short stature and pituitary and hindbrain defects. An alternative splice variant has been described but its biological nature has not been determined.

References

Further reading